Luis Alonzo Torres Vargas (born 3 February 1993) is a Belizean professional footballer who currently plays for Altitude FC and the Belize national football team as a winger or forward.

Club career
Torres won back to back Championships with Placencia Assassins in the 2012 Premier League of Belize and 2011 Super League of Belize.

International career
In 2013 Torres played in all three  of Belize U20's games at the 2013 Central American Games, and scored against Nicaragua in a 2–1 victory.

He was also part of Belize's 23 man squad for the 2013 CONCACAF Gold Cup.

External links

 Nicaragua U20 vs. Belize U20  1 - 2

References

1993 births
Living people
Belize international footballers
Belizean footballers
Premier League of Belize players
2013 Copa Centroamericana players
2013 CONCACAF Gold Cup players
2017 Copa Centroamericana players
Georgetown Ibayani FC players

Association football wingers
Altitude FC (Belize) players
Association football forwards
Belmopan Bandits players
Police United FC (Belize) players
Belize under-20 international footballers